Luke Williams (born 24 December 1979) is an Australian former cricketer. He played in five first-class matches for South Australia in 2000/01. Following his playing career, he became the coach of the South Australian Scorpions and the Adelaide Strikers in the Women's Big Bash League.

See also
 List of South Australian representative cricketers

References

External links
 

1979 births
Living people
Australian cricketers
South Australia cricketers
Cricketers from Adelaide